This is an alphabetized list of notable solo pianists who play (or played) classical music on the piano. For those who worked with other pianists as piano duos, see List of classical piano duos (performers). For a list of recorded classical pianists, see List of classical pianists (recorded).

A

Ab-Am 

 Behzod Abduraimov
 Ludwig Abeille
 Jacques Abram
 Adolovni Acosta
 Armenta Adams
 Daniel Adni
 Adrian Aeschbacher
 Valery Afanassiev
 Guido Agosti
 Pierre-Laurent Aimard
 Webster Aitken
 Nelly Akopian-Tamarina
 Giuseppe Albanese
 Isaac Albéniz
 Pedro Albéniz
 Eugen d'Albert
 Charlie Albright
 Dmitri Alexeev
 Charles-Valentin Alkan
 Victor Aller
 Ilse von Alpenheim
 Louis Demetrius Alvanis
 Stefan Ammer
 Carl Arnold

An-Az 

 Géza Anda
 Piotr Anderszewski
 Leif Ove Andsnes
 Nicholas Angelich
 Agustin Anievas
 Eteri Andjaparidze
 Charles-François Angelet
 Conrad Ansorge
 Jean-François Antonioli
 Mireya Arboleda
 Anton Arensky
 Martha Argerich
 Kit Armstrong
 Yvonne Arnaud
 Claudio Arrau
 Lydia Artymiw
 Şahan Arzruni
 Vladimir Ashkenazy
 Stefan Askenase
 Lola Astanova
 Ebba d'Aubert
 Lera Auerbach
 Adele aus der Ohe
 Myriam Avalos
 Yulianna Avdeeva
 Valda Aveling
 Emanuel Ax
 Nadia Azzi

B

Bab-Ban 

 Sergei Babayan
 Stanley Babin
 Victor Babin
 Carl Philipp Emanuel Bach
 Johann Sebastian Bach
 Gina Bachauer
 Walter Bache
 Agathe Backer-Grøndahl
 Fridtjof Backer-Grøndahl
 Wilhelm Backhaus
 Farhad Badalbeyli
 Paul Badura-Skoda
 Ryszard Bakst
 Mily Balakirev
 Dalton Baldwin
 Ernő Balogh
 Artur Balsam
 Joseph Banowetz

Bar-Bay 

 Daniel Barenboim
 Simon Barere
 Rami Bar-Niv
 David Bar-Illan
 Trevor Barnard
 Nerine Barrett
 Heinrich Barth
 Martin James Bartlett
 Béla Bartók
 Marmaduke Barton
 Dmitri Bashkirov
 Leon Bates
 Harold Bauer
 Paul Baumgartner

Beb-Beu 

 Betty Humby Beecham
 Ludwig van Beethoven
 Victor Bendix
 William Sterndale Bennett
 Nelly Ben-Or
 Boris Berezovsky
 Martin Berkofsky
 Ludmila Berlinskaya
 Bart Berman
 Boris Berman
 Lazar Berman
 Yara Bernette
 Leonard Bernstein
 Henri Bertini
 Stephen Beus

Bi-Bl 

 Philippe Bianconi
 Fabio Bidini
 Malcolm Bilson
 Malcolm Binns
 İdil Biret
 Tessa Birnie
 Hans Bischoff
 Jonathan Biss
 Georges Bizet
 William Black
 Rafał Blechacz
 Aline Reese Blondner
 Fannie Bloomfield Zeisler
 Felix Blumenfeld
 Felicja Blumental
 Daniel Blumenthal

Bo 

 Mary Louise Boehm
 Gergely Bogányi
 Jorge Bolet
 Stefano Bollani
 Marie-Léontine Bordes-Pène
 Victor Borge
 Sergei Bortkiewicz
 Leonard Borwick
 Coenraad V. Bos
 Geir Botnen
 Nadia Boulanger
 Hendrik Bouman
 Andreas Boyde
 Emma Boynet

Bra-Bru 

 Vera Bradford
 Alexander Braginsky
 Johannes Brahms
 Alexander Brailowsky
 Frank Braley
 Natan Brand
 Louis Brassin
 Jens Harald Bratlie
 Ronald Brautigam
 Alice Verne-Bredt
 Alfred Brendel
 Jim Brickman
 Benjamin Britten
 Kenny Broberg
 Yefim Bronfman
 Edwin Orion Brownell
 John Browning
 Bruce Brubaker
 Ignaz Brüll
 Theo Bruins
 David Brunell

Bu-By 

 Rudolf Buchbinder
 Sara Davis Buechner
 Richard Buhlig
 Hans von Bülow
 Josef Bulva
 Khatia Buniatishvili
 Stanislav Bunin
 Johann Friedrich Franz Burgmüller
 Geoffrey Burleson
 Winifred Burston
 Ammiel Bushakevitz
 Ferruccio Busoni
 Winifred Byrd

C 

 Sofia Cabruja
 Sarah Cahill
 Michele Campanella
 Rose Cannabich
 Bruno Canino
 John Carmichael
 Roberto Carnevale
 Teresa Carreño
 Gaby Casadesus
 Jean Casadesus
 Robert Casadesus
 Gianluca Cascioli
 Ricardo Castro
 Boris Cepeda
 Marcelo Moraes Caetano

Ch-Cl 

 Bertrand Chamayou
 Cécile Chaminade
 Angelin Chang
 Fenia Chang
 Nellie Chaplin
 Abram Chasins
 Chen Sa
 Angela Cheng
 Cheng Wai
 Shura Cherkassky
 Milana Chernyavska
 Rachel Cheung
 Jan Chiapusso
 Joan Chissell
 Gian Paolo Chiti
 Seong-Jin Cho
 Frédéric Chopin
 Daniel Chorzempa
 Winifred Christie
 Alton Chung Ming Chan
 Marcel Ciampi
 Dino Ciani
 Aldo Ciccolini
 Tamara Anna Cislowska
 Wilhelmine Clauss-Szarvady
 Muzio Clementi
 Van Cliburn
 France Clidat

Coa-Cop 

 Theodor Coccius
 Julian Cochran
 Arnaldo Cohen
 Harriet Cohen
 Naida Cole
 Edgar Coleman
 Jean-Philippe Collard
 Stephen Colletti
 Graziella Concas
 Claudio Constantini
 Sylvia Constantinidis
 John Contiguglia
 Richard Contiguglia
 Stephen Coombs
 Gary Cooper
 Imogen Cooper
 Aaron Copland

Cor-Cz 

 Alfred Cortot
 Romola Costantino
 Henry Cowell
 Johann Baptist Cramer
 Patrick Crommelynck
 Tan Crone
 Jill Crossland
 Lamar Crowson
 Adlan Cruz
 José Cubiles
 Richard Cudmore
 Sir Clifford Curzon
 Halina Czerny-Stefańska
 Carl Czerny
 György Cziffra

D

Da-De 

 Edward Dannreuther
 Jeanne-Marie Darré
 Fanny Davies
 Bella Davidovich
 Ivan Davis
 Karin Dayas
 William Dayas
 Jozef De Beenhouwer
 Claude Debussy
 Sylviane Deferne
 Cor de Groot
 Steven De Groote
 Élie-Miriam Delaborde
 Eduardo Delgado
 Adelina de Lara
 Jörg Demus
 Jeremy Denk
 Alicia de Larrocha
 Vladimir de Pachmann
 Nikolai Demidenko
 William Denis Browne

Di-Du 

 Anthony di Bonaventura
 Misha Dichter
 Louis Diémer
 Simone Dinnerstein
 Paul Doguereau
 Ernő Dohnányi
 Peter Donohoe
 Ania Dorfmann
 Barry Douglas
 Marylène Dosse
 Alexander Dreyschock
 Danny Driver
 Zbigniew Drzewiecki
 Jean Dubé
 Florence Kirsch Du Brul
 François-René Duchâble
 Jan Ladislav Dussek

E

Ec-Em 

 Severin von Eckardstein
 Bracha Eden
 Richard Egarr
 Pavel Egorov
 Youri Egorov
 Violetta Egorova
 Severin Eisenberger
 Detlev Eisinger
 Abdel Rahman El Bacha
 Dror Elimelech

En-Ez 

 Michael Endres
 Per Enflo
 Karl Engel
 Philippe Entremont
 Julius Epstein
 Tzvi Erez
 Christoph Eschenbach
 Carolina Estrada
 Morton Estrin
 Róża Etkin-Moszkowska
 Lindley Evans

F

Fa-Fl 

 Mikhaïl Faerman
 Joel Fan
 Edith Farnadi
 Richard Farrell
 Iain Farrington
 Anna Fedorova
 José Feghali
 Samuil Feinberg
 Till Fellner
 Vladimir Feltsman
 Albert Ferber
 Arthur Ferrante
 Jacques Février
 Janina Fialkowska
 John Field
 James Henry Fields
 Margaret Fingerhut
 Sergio Fiorentino
 Rudolf Firkušný
 Annie Fischer
 Edith Fischer 
 Caroline Fischer
 Edwin Fischer
 Norma Fisher
 Philip Edward Fisher
 Graham Fitch
 Leon Fleisher
 Yakov Flier
 Ingrid Fliter

Fo-Fu 

 Andor Földes
 Grace Fong
 Julian Fontana
 Bengt Forsberg
 W. O. Forsyth
 Fou Ts'ong
 Felix Fox
 Malcolm Frager
 Homero Francesch
 Samson François
 Massimiliano Frani
 Claude Frank
 Peter Frankl
 Justus Frantz
 David Fray
 Nelson Freire
 Etelka Freund
 Carl Friedberg
 Arthur Friedheim
 Ignaz Friedman
 Mao Fujita
 Sachiko Furuhata-Kersting
 Margarita Fyodorova

G

Ga-Gl 

 Ossip Gabrilowitsch
 Henriette Gaertner
 Neil Galanter
 Rudolph Ganz
 Umi Garrett
 Mark Gasser
 Ivana Gavrić
 Andrei Gavrilov
 Alexander Gavrylyuk
 Heinrich Gebhard
 Kemal Gekić
 Bruno Leonardo Gelber
 Ingrid Fuzjko V. Georgii-Hemming
 Kirill Gerstein
 Carmen Geutjes
 Alexander Ghindin
 Jack Gibbons
 Walter Gieseking
 Emil Gilels
 Rhondda Gillespie
 Boris Giltburg
 Jakob Gimpel
 Pavel Gintov
 Grigory Ginzburg
 Katrine Gislinge
 Frank Glazer
 Marija Gluvakov

Go 

 Arabella Goddard
 Leopold Godowsky
 Mona Golabek
 Edward Gold
 Alexander Goldenweiser
 Rubin Goldmark
 Robert Goldsand
 Stefano Golinelli
 Alexis Golovin
 David Golub
 Richard Goode
 Isador Goodman
 Judith Gordon
 Daniel Gortler
 Ralf Gothóni
 Louis Moreau Gottschalk
 Glenn Gould
 Anna Gourari

Gr-Gu 

 Enrique Graf
 Gary Graffman
 Alasdair Graham
 Percy Grainger
 Enrique Granados
 Jeffrey Grice
 Edvard Grieg
 Hélène Grimaud
 Maria Grinberg
 Bonnie Gritton
 Samuel Grodin
 Andreas Groethuysen
 Benjamin Grosvenor
 Shengying Gu
 Alberto Guerrero
 Friedrich Gulda
 Youra Guller
 Horacio Gutiérrez
 László Gyimesi

H

Ha 

 Monique Haas
 Werner Haas
 Ingrid Haebler
 Andreas Haefliger
 Michael Habermann
 Reynaldo Hahn
 Sir Charles Hallé
 Adolph Hallis
 Mark Hambourg
 Leonid Hambro
 Marc-André Hamelin
 Ambre Hammond
 Adam Harasiewicz
 Frits Hartvigson
 Michael Kieran Harvey
 Clara Haskil
 Joyce Hatto
 Walter Hautzig
 Joseph Haydn

He-Hi 

 Inna Heifetz
 Claude Helffer
 David Helfgott
 Stephen Heller
 Gerard Hengeveld
 Dennis Hennig
 Adolf von Henselt
 Henri Herz
 Dame Myra Hess
 Barbara Hesse-Bukowska
 Angela Hewitt
 Peter Hill
 Eric Himy

Ho-Hu 

 Rex Hobcroft
 Ian Hobson
 Josef Hofmann
 Margarita Höhenrieder
 Otakar Hollmann
 Vladimir Horowitz
 Mieczysław Horszowski
 Andrej Hoteev
 Stephen Hough
 Alan Hovhaness
 Leslie Howard
 Philip Howard
 Daniel Hsu
 Ching-Yun Hu
 Yvonne Hubert
 Johann Nepomuk Hummel
 Bruce Hungerford
 Anastasia Huppmann

I 

 Valentina Igoshina
 Konstantin Igumnov
 Ivan Ilić
 Jos Van Immerseel
 Ingmar Piano Duo
 Stanislav Ioudenitch
 Clelia Iruzun
 Yoram Ish-Hurwitz
 Eugene Istomin
 Kei Itoh
 Amparo Iturbi
 José Iturbi
 Antonio Iturrioz
 Christian Ivaldi
 Andrei Ivanovitch

J

Ja-Je 

 Peter Jablonski
 Paul Jacobs
 Katarzyna Jaczynowska
 Zoran G. Jančić
 Jenő Jandó
 Byron Janis
 Tasso Janopoulo
 Rudolf Jansen
 Gintaras Januševičius
 Adolf Jensen
 José Manuel Jiménez Berroa

Jo-Ju 

 Grant Johannesen
 Gunnar Johansen
 Jovianney Emmanuel Cruz
 Graham Johnson
 Henry Jolles
 Maryla Jonas
 Rafael Joseffy
 Bradley Joseph
 William Joseph
 Geneviève Joy-Dutilleux
 Eileen Joyce
 Terence Judd
 Scott Joplin
 Joonatan Jürgenson

K

Ka 

 Ilona Kabos
 Jeffrey Kahane
 Percy Kahn
 Joseph Kalichstein
 Gilbert Kalish
 Friedrich Kalkbrenner
 William Kapell
 Richard Kapp
 Jozef Kapustka
 Danae Kara
 Natalia Karp
 Yakov Kasman
 Andrey Kasparov
 Julius Katchen
 Peter Katin
 Cyprien Katsaris
 Amir Katz
 Martin Katz
 Mindru Katz

Ke-Kl 

 Constance Keene
 Simone Keller
 Freddy Kempf
 Wilhelm Kempff
 Sean Kennard
 Kevin Kenner
 Louis Kentner
 Olga Kern
 Mikhail Kerzelli
 Minuetta Kessler
 Eugène Ketterer
 Stanislav Khegai
 Frederick B. Kiddle
 Edward Kilenyi
 Gary Kirkpatrick
 John Kirkpatrick
 Anatole Kitain
 Margaret Kitchin
 Evgeny Kissin
 Dmitri Klebanov
 Elisabeth Klein
 Jacques Klein
 Walter Klien
 Paul Klengel

Ko-Kr 

 Aimi Kobayashi
 Alexander Kobrin
 Tobias Koch
 Zoltán Kocsis
 Raoul (von) Koczalski
 Mari Kodama
 Alan Kogosowski
 Lubka Kolessa
 Alfons Kontarsky
 Aloys Kontarsky
 Anton de Kontski
 Jason Kouchak
 Giorgio Koukl
 Stephen Kovacevich
 Leopold Koželuch
 Vladimir Krainev
 Lili Kraus
 Martin Krause
 Anna Kravtchenko
 Gustav Kross
 Vladimir Krpan

Ku-Ky 

 Antonín Kubálek
 Anton Kuerti
 Friedrich Kuhlau
 Theodor Kullak
 Miroslav Kultyshev
 Eduard Kunz
 Vilém Kurz
 Elena Kuschnerova
 Christiaan Kuyvenhoven
 Leonid Kuzmin
 Radoslav Kvapil
 Rena Kyriakou

L

La 

 Katia Labèque
 Marielle Labèque
 Carl Lachmund
 Carles Lama
 Frederic Lamond
 Geoffrey Lancaster
 Walter Landauer
 Wanda Landowska
 Piers Lane
 Lang Lang
 Milan Langer
 Cosimo Damiano Lanza
 Ruth Laredo
 Ervin László
 Jacob Lateiner
 Risto Lauriala
 Franz Lauska
 Horacio Lavandera
 Ingmar Lazar
 George-Emmanuel Lazaridis
 Igor Lazko

Le 

 Ka Ling Colleen Lee
 Denoe Leedy
 Reinbert de Leeuw
 Ralph Leopold
 Christian Leotta
 Theodor Leschetizky
 Daniel Lessner
 Ray Lev
 Eric Le Van
 Oscar Levant
 Beth Levin
 Robert Levin
 Robert D. Levin
 James Levine
 Igor Levit
 Mischa Levitzki
 Daniel Levy
 Ernst Levy
 Raymond Lewenthal
 Paul Lewis

Lh-Li 

 Josef Lhévinne
 Rosina Lhévinne
 George Li
 Ming Qiang Li
 Li Yundi
 Liberace
 Cecile Licad
 John Lill
 Yunchan Lim
 Arthur Moreira Lima
 Christiana Lin
 Jenny Lin
 Dinu Lipatti
 Jan Lisiecki
 Valentina Lisitsa
 James Lisney
 Eugene List
 Barbara Lister-Sink
 Franz Liszt
 Kate Liu

Lo 

 Peter Lockwood
 Nicolai Lomov
 Kathleen Long
 Marguerite Long
 Thomas Lorango
 Roger Lord
 Wolfram Lorenzen
 Yvonne Loriod
 Louis Lortie
 Iris Loveridge
 Anne Lovett
 Jerome Lowenthal

Lu-Ly 

 Alexei Lubimov
 Nikolai Lugansky
 Jean-Marc Luisada
 Radu Lupu
 Witold Lutosławski
 Sergei Lyapunov
 Moura Lympany
 Charles Lynch
 Clive Lythgoe

M

Maa-Mal 

 Edward MacDowell
 Joanna MacGregor
 Geoffrey Douglas Madge
 Aleksandar Madžar
 Nikita Magaloff
 Frederik Magle
 Désiré Magnus
 Petronel Malan
 Krzysztof Malek
 Anna Malikova
 Witold Małcużyński

Mar–Maz 

 Rosario Marciano
 Adele Marcus
 Irén Marik
 Ozan Marsh
 Oleg Marshev
 Philip Martin
 Malcolm Martineau
 João Carlos Martins
 Giuseppe Martucci
 Jean-Pierre Marty
 Eduard Marxsen
 William Mason
 William Masselos
 Draga Matković
 Denis Matsuev
 Colette Maze

Mc-Mi 

 Edwin McArthur
 Stephanie McCallum
 Leon McCawley
 Anne-Marie McDermott
 Murray McLachlan
 Nikolai Medtner
 Hephzibah Menuhin
 Yaltah Menuhin
 Susan Merdinger
 Yolanda Mero
 Janne Mertanen
 Victor Merzhanov
 Noel Mewton-Wood
 Marcelle Meyer
 Stefano Miceli
 Aleksander Michałowski
 Arturo Benedetti Michelangeli
 Miloš Mihajlović
 Karol Mikuli
 Kenneth G. Mills
 Hamish Milne
 Martha Mier

Mo-Mu 

 Benno Moiseiwitsch
 Gabriela Montero
 Sergio Monteiro
 Emánuel Moór
 Gerald Moore
 Ivan Moravec
 Harold Morris
 Ignaz Moscheles
 Jurij Moskvitin
 Moritz Moszkowski
 Franz Xaver Wolfgang Mozart
 Wolfgang Amadeus Mozart
 Ian Munro
 Mieczysław Munz
 William Murdoch
 Julien Musafia
 Olli Mustonen

N

Na-Ne 

 Jon Nakamatsu
 Alexei Nasedkin
 Soheil Nasseri
 Yves Nat
 Eldar Nebolsin
 Anton Nel
 Pascal Nemirovski
 Heinrich Neuhaus
 Edmund Neupert
 Ethelbert Nevin
 Anthony Newman
 Elly Ney

Ni-Ny 

 Reid Nibley
 Francesco Nicolosi
 Stanislas Niedzielski
 Mitja Nikisch
 Tatiana Nikolayeva
 Andrei Nikolsky
 David Owen Norris
 Eunice Norton
 Gustav Nottebohm
 Guiomar Novaes
 Marie Novello
 Theodosia Ntokou
 Ervin Nyiregyházi

O 

 Lev Oborin
 John O'Conor
 John Ogdon
 Garrick Ohlsson
 Santos Ojeda
 David Ezra Okonşar
 Janusz Olejniczak
 Bart van Oort
 Ursula Oppens
 Gerhard Oppitz
 Christopher O'Riley
 Nikolai Orlov
 József Örmény
 Leo Ornstein
 Rafael Orozco
 Cristina Ortiz
 Steven Osborne
 Alexander Osminin
 Clio-Danae Othoneou
 Henrique Oswald
 Cécile Ousset
 Vladimir Ovchinnikov

P

Pa 

 Enrico Pace
 Vladimir de Pachmann
 Ignacy Jan Paderewski
 Kun-Woo Paik
 Natasha Paremski
 Jon Kimura Parker
 Natalya Pasichnyk
 Ernst Pauer
 Victor Paukstelis

Pe-Pi 

 Güher Pekinel
 Süher Pekinel
 Leonard Pennario
 Murray Perahia
 Henriette von Pereira-Arnstein
 Neal Peres Da Costa
 Alfredo Perl
 Vlado Perlemuter
 Vincent Persichetti
 Yella Pessl
 Egon Petri
 Christina Petrowska-Quilico
 Carlos Alfredo Peyrellade
 Isidor Philipp
 Andrzej Pikul
 Cecilia Pillado
 George Pinto
 Maria João Pires
 Johann Peter Pixis
 Artur Pizarro

Pl-Po 

 Francis Planté
 Mikhail Pletnev
 Ignaz Pleyel
 Jonathan Plowright
 Leo Podolsky
 Ivo Pogorelić
 François-Xavier Poizat
 Daniel Pollack
 Maurizio Pollini
 Antonio Pompa-Baldi
 Michael Ponti
 Roland Pöntinen
 Tiffany Poon
 Stephen Portman
 Paul Posnak
 Viktoria Postnikova
 Cipriani Potter
 Harrison Potter
 Leff Pouishnoff
 Francis Poulenc
 Jonathan Powell
 Lloyd Powell

Pr-Pu 

 Awadagin Pratt
 Menahem Pressler
 André Previn
 Vassily Primakov
 Paul Procopolis
 Sergei Prokofiev
 Roland Pröll
 Roberto Prosseda
 Svetla Protich
 Raoul Pugno

Q 
 Anne Queffélec

R

Ra-Re 

 Alexander Raab
 Roman Rabinovich
 Valentin Radu
 Sergei Rachmaninoff
 Ezra Rachlin
 Thomas Rajna
 Dezső Ránki
 Siegfried Rapp
 Michael Raucheisen
 Marjan Rawicz
 Alexander Raytchev
 Walter Rehberg
 Carl Reinecke
 Julius Reubke
 Lívia Rév
 Eliane Reyes

Ri 

 Sviatoslav Richter
 Hans Richter-Haaser
 Ferdinand Ries
 Herman Rietzel
 Bernard Ringeissen
 Diana Ringo
 Édouard Risler
 Anastasia Rizikov

Ro-Rz 

 Bernard Roberts
 Santiago Rodriguez
 Pascal Rogé
 Michael Roll
 Helmut Roloff
 Aleksandra Romanić
 Marcel Rominger
 Sir Landon Ronald
 Julius Röntgen
 Martin Roscoe
 Jerome Rose
 Charles Rosen
 Carol Rosenberger
 Moriz Rosenthal
 Nicholas Roth
 Jacques Rouvier
 Mūza Rubackytė
 Anton Rubinstein
 Arthur Rubinstein
 Nikolai Rubinstein
 Mikhail Rudy
 James Russo
 Frans van Ruth
 Frederic Rzewski

S

Sa 

 Geoffrey Saba
 Vasily Safonov
 Camille Saint-Saëns
 Anton Salnikov
 Pnina Salzman
 Olga Samaroff
 Adnan Sami
 Harold Samuel
 György Sándor
 Victor Sangiorgio
 Jesús María Sanromá
 Arthur Napoleão dos Santos
 Wassily Sapellnikoff
 Erik Satie
 Emil von Sauer
 Amandine Savary
 Jean-Marc Savelli
 Marko Savić
 Fazıl Say

Sca-Schm 

 Domenico Scarlatti
 Irene Scharrer
 Xaver Scharwenka
 Konstantin Scherbakov
 Ann Schein Carlyss
 Olga Scheps
 Valentin Schiedermair
 András Schiff
 Madeline Schiller
 Victor Schiøler
 Steffen Schleiermacher
 Burkard Schliessmann
 Peter Schmalfuss
 Helmut Schmidt
 Johan Schmidt
 E. Robert Schmitz

Schn-Schw 

 Artur Schnabel
 Karl Ulrich Schnabel
 Andre-Michel Schub
 Franz Schubert
 Clara Schumann
 Robert Schumann
 Ludwig Schuncke
 Arminda Schutte

Sci-Sg 

 Giacomo Scinardo
 Hazel Scott
 Alexander Scriabin
 Isidor Seiss
 Kathryn Selby
 Blanche Selva
 Peter Serkin
 Rudolf Serkin
 Dimitris Sgouros
 Timur Selçuk

Sh-Si 

 Regina Shamvili
 Barbara Shearer
 Harrison Sheckler
 Mordecai Shehori
 Howard Shelley
 Anatoly Sheludyakov
 Roy Shepherd
 Russell Sherman
 Norman Shetler
 Dmitri Shostakovich
 Bella Shteinbuk
 Leonard Shure
 Clara Isabella Siegle
 Valery Sigalevitch
 Antti Siirala
 Béla Síki
 Alexander Siloti
 Abbey Simon
 Leo Sirota
 Larry Sitsky

Sl-Sr 

 Heather Slade-Lipkin
 Ruth Slenczynska
 Alexander Slobodyanik
 Lindsay Sloper
 Sigurd Slåttebrekk
 Regina Smendzianka
 Jan Smeterlin
 Leo Smit
 Cyril Smith
 Ronald Smith
 Sydney Smith
 Wibi Soerjadi
 Vladimir Sofronitsky
 Grigory Sokolov
 Ivan Sokolov
 Juan María Solare
 Solomon
 Wonny Song
 Kaikhosru Shapurji Sorabji
 Gonzalo Soriano
 Jaap Spaanderman
 Pietro Spada
 Dubravka Tomšič Srebotnjak

St 

 Peter Stadlen
 Martin Stadtfeld
 Andreas Staier
 Fanny Stål
 Camille-Marie Stamaty
 Susan Starr
 Bernhard Stavenhagen
 Daniel Steibelt
 Pavel Štěpán
 Ilona Štěpánová-Kurzová
 Edna Stern
 Eduard Steuermann
 Ronald Stevenson
 Johanne Stockmarr
 Zygmunt Stojowski
 Kathryn Stott
 August Stradal
 Soulima Stravinsky

Su-Sz 

 Szuyu Rachel Su
 Evelyn Suart
 Yevgeny Sudbin
 Iyad Sughayer
 Grete Sultan
 Alexei Sultanov
 Sun Meiting
 Sun Yingdi
 Yekwon Sunwoo
 Rose and Ottilie Sutro
 Alexander Sverjensky
 Yevgeny Svetlanov
 Ruslan Sviridov
 David Syme
 Beata Szalwinska
 Roberto Szidon
 Balázs Szokolay
 Władysław Szpilman

T

Ta-Th 

 Gabriel Tacchino
 Yaara Tal
 Magda Tagliaferro
 Mark Taimanov
 Alexander Tamir
 Alexandre Tansman
 Sergei Tarnowsky
 Karl Tausig
 Christopher Taylor
 Simon Tedeschi
 Louis Teicher
 Gerardo Teissonniere
 Thomas Tellefsen
 Alfred Teltschik
 Per Tengstrand
 Sigismond Thalberg
 Károly Thern
 Louis Thern
 Willi Thern
 Jean-Yves Thibaudet
 François-Joël Thiollier
 Penelope Thwaites

Ti-Ty 

 Ignaz Tiegerman
 Sergio Tiempo
 Vera Timanova
 James Tocco
 Václav Tomášek
 Alexander Toradze
 Donald Tovey
 Geoffrey Tozer
 Max Trapp
 Daniil Trifonov
 Simon Trpčeski
 Valerie Tryon
 Richard Aaker Trythall
 Nobuyuki Tsujii
 David Tudor
 Józef Turczyński
 Rosalyn Tureck
 Tarja Turunen
 Anderson Tyrer
 Hélène Tysman

U 

 Mitsuko Uchida
 Ayako Uehara
 Emilia Uggla
 Alexander Uninsky
 Rem Urasin
 Roberto Urbay

V

Va-Ve 

 Mariangela Vacatello
 Vladimir Valjarević
 John Vallier
 Nick van Bloss
 Arie Vardi
 Tamás Vásáry
 Ester Vela
 Eulalia Vela
 Giovanni Velluti
 Ilana Vered
 Adela Verne
 Mathilde Verne
 Matthijs Verschoor

Vi-Vr 

 José Vianna da Motta
 Vladimir Viardo
 Roger Vignoles
 Ivan Vihor
 Joseph Villa
 Ricardo Viñes
 Anastasia Virsaladze
 Eliso Virsaladze
 Stefan Vladar
 Pancho Vladigerov
 Oleg Volkov
 Alexei Volodin
 Arcadi Volodos
 Andrew von Oeyen
 Franz Vorraber
 Ralph Votapek
 Vitya Vronsky

W

Wa 

 Elena Waiss
 Althea Waites
 Émile Waldteufel
 Ernest Walker
 William Vincent Wallace
 Peter Wallfisch
 Bruno Walter
 Yuja Wang
 Andrzej Wasowski
 Huw Watkins
 André Watts

We-Wn 

 Beveridge Webster
 Nancy Weir
 Alan Weiss
 Orion Weiss
 Alexis Weissenberg
 Chris Mary Francine Whittle
 Ueli Wiget
 Earl Wild
 Gerard Willems
 Llŷr Williams
 Michael Glenn Williams
 Malcolm Williamson
 Walburga Willmann
 Paul Wittgenstein
 Daniel Wnukowski

Wo-Wu 

 Galina Werschenska
 Joseph Wölfl
 Ernst Victor Wolff
 Joseph Wölfl
 Eleanor Wong
 Roger Woodward
 Bolesław Woytowicz
 Roger Wright
 Ingolf Wunder
 Friedrich Wührer

X 
 Di Xiao

Y 

 Oxana Yablonskaya
 Marina Yakhlakova
 Ivan Yanakov
 Anna Yesipova
 Ramzi Yassa
 Christine Yoshikawa
 Jeanne You
 Avan Yu
 Maria Yudina
 Yanni
 Yiruma
 Yoshiki Hayashi

Z 

 Franciszek Zachara
 Yakov Zak
 Berenika Zakrzewski
 Evgeny Zarafiants
 Carlo Zecchi
 Dieter Zechlin
 Mark Zeltser
 Zhu Xiao-Mei
 Igor Zhukov
 Lilya Zilberstein
 Krystian Zimerman
 Tadeusz Żmudziński
 Zhang Zuo
 Nikolai Zverev
 Wojciech Żywny

See also
List of women classical pianists

References 

Classical Pianists
 
Pianists